Max Kilsby (born 04 October 2003) is an English professional footballer who plays as a defender for Annan Athletic on loan from EFL League Two side Carlisle United.

Playing career
Kilsby came through the youth-team at Carlisle United and in May 2022 signed his first professional contract.  
In July 2022 he joined Annan Athletic on loan until January 2023. This Loan was extended in January 2023 until the end of the 2022/23 season. Kilsby scored his first goal for Annan Athletic on the 23rd of December 2022, scoring the 4th goal in a 5-1 win at home to Albion Rovers. On the 21st of January 2023 he scored his second goal for Annan Athletic in a 4-0 win against Bonnyrigg Rose and scored again a week later in a 3-0 win against East Fife F.C.

Style of play
Carlisle United manager Paul Simpson, said of Kilsby 'He’s left-sided, which are hard to find, he can play left wing-back, left centre-back, possibly even go into midfield, so he gives us a few options' Annan Athletic Manager, Peter Murphy, stated 'Max is a real prospect in the Carlisle United ranks and we are delighted  to welcome him to Annan Athletic'.

Statistics

References

2003 births
Living people
English footballers
Association football defenders
Carlisle United F.C. players
Annan Athletic F.C. players
Scottish Professional Football League players